The MBC Cup (Korean: MBC배) is an annual competition organized by the Korea University Basketball Federation (Korean: 한국대학농구연맹) and sponsored by broadcaster Munhwa Broadcasting Corporation (MBC). It is one of the oldest basketball competitions in South Korea for college teams and predates the U-League. In Korean-language media, it is known by its full name MBC Cup National University Basketball Championship (Korean: MBC배 전국대학농구대회) to differentiate it from another similarly named competitions for college students in other sports.

Prior to the establishment of the professional Korean Basketball League in 1997, basketball was an amateur sport and all senior teams participated in the National Basketball Festival (Korean: 농구대잔치), regardless of whether it was sponsored by the Korea Armed Forces Athletic Corps, corporate companies or universities. The MBC Cup was considered unique for that era as it was strictly limited to college teams.

Up until the 2000s, the tournament was primarily hosted by Jamsil Students' Gymnasium in Seoul, hence the name of the venue. The tournament was later marketed as a tournament part of the wider nationwide multi-sport National Youth Sports Festival for student-athletes and has been hosted by various cities.

Teams
The competition is open to member universities of the Korea University Basketball Federation (KUBF). In the men's competition, Division 1 teams also participate in the KUSF U-League, the elite level of competition. Division 2 teams participate in the KUSF Club Championship. In the women's competition, both U-League and non-U-League teams play against each other.

Winners

Men's competition — Division 1

Men's competition — Division 2

Women's competition

Notes

References

External links
Records: MBC Cup — Korea University Basketball Federation website 

University and college basketball in South Korea